The  was a Japanese samurai clan that were a branch of the Takeda clan of Kai Province. Their main stronghold was Kanamaru Castle. They were known for their martial prowess and discipline. They were master the use of teppō units, and their ashigaru are trained in all types of commands, strategies, sword fighting in the use of these arquebuses.

Origins
The Kanamaru clan are a branch family of the Takeda clan of Kai Province who descend from Minamoto no Yoshikiyo of the Seiwa Genji branch of the Minamoto clan. Kanamaru Mitsushige (金丸光重), the founder of the clan was the third son of Takeda Nobushige (武田信重) but he had no children. His adopted heir, Kanamaru Mitsunobu (金丸光信), was a son of Ishiki Fujinao (一色藤直).

Family Tree
 Takeda Nobushige (武田信重, 1386–1450)
  　┃
 Kanamaru Mitsushige (金丸光重, ?–?), Kanamaru Uemon (金丸右衛門).
  　┇
 Kanamaru Mitsunobu (金丸光信, ?–?), adopted, was Ishiki Fujitsugu (一色藤次), son of Ishiki Fujinao (一色藤直).
  　┃
 Kanamaru Taketsugu (金丸虎嗣, ?–?), Wakasa-no-kami (若狭守).
  　┃
 Kanamaru Takeyoshi (金丸虎義, ?–?), Chikuzen-no-kami (筑前守).
 Six sons:
 1st: Kanamaru Masanao (金丸昌直, ?–?)
 2nd: Tsuchiyama Masatsugu (土屋昌続, 1544–1575)
 3rd: Akiyama Chikahisa (秋山親久, 1562–1582)
 4th: Kanamaru Sadamitsu (金丸定光, ?–1582)
 5th: Tsuchiyama Masatsune (土屋昌恒, 1566?–1582)
 6th: Tsuchiyama Masanao (土屋正直, ?–?)

  　┣━━━━━━━━━━━━━━━━━━━━━━━━━━━━━━━━━━━━━━━━━━━━━━━━━┓
 Kanamaru Masanao (金丸昌直, ?–?)　　　　　　 Kanamaru Sadamitsu (定光, ?–1582)
  　╠═════════════════════════════════════════════════╝
 Sadamitsu (定光, ?–1582), adopted by older brother.
  　┃
 Sadanobu (定信, ?–?)
 　 ┣━━━━━━━━━━━━━━━━━━━━━━━━━━━━━┓
 Shigetsugu (重次, ?–?)　　   Yoshitsugu (吉次)
  　┃
 Shigeyoshi (重良, ?–?)
  　┃
 Shigemasa (重政, ?–?)
  　┣━━━━━━━━━━━━━━━━━━━━━━━━━━━━━━━━━━━━┳━━━━━━━━━━━━━━━━━━━━━━━━━━━━━━━━━━┓
 Choshirō (長四郎, ?–?) 　　　　  Domon Masatoyo (多門正豊)　　　　　　　Sadatomo (定曹)
  　┇
 Sadatoyo (定曹, ?–?)
  　╠════════════════════════════════════╗
 Matasaburo (又三郎, ?–?)　　 　　　  Takemitsu (虎光)

See also
 Takeda clan
 Seiwa Genji
 Minamoto clan

Japanese clans
Takeda clan